The 2008 IAAF World Athletics Tour was the third edition of the annual global circuit of one-day track and field competitions organized by the International Association of Athletics Federations (IAAF). The series featured 25 one-day meetings, consisting of the six meetings of the 2008 IAAF Golden League, five IAAF Super Grand Prix meetings, and fourteen IAAF Grand Prix meetings. In addition, there were 29 Area Permit Meetings that carried point-scoring events. The series culminated in the two-day 2008 IAAF World Athletics Final, held in Stuttgart, Germany from 13 to 14 September.

Russian pole vaulter Yelena Isinbayeva scored the most points during the circuit, with a total of 112. Cuban hurdler Dayron Robles was the highest scoring male athlete with 102 points. Four other athletes achieved a total of 100 points: sprinter Jeremy Wariner, middle-distance runner Pamela Jelimo, hurdler David Oliver, and high jumper Blanka Vlašić.

Schedule

Points standings
Athletes earned points at meetings during the series. The following athletes were the top performers for their event prior to the World Athletics Final.

References

2008
World Athletics Tour